"How Insensitive" is a bossa nova and jazz standard song composed by Brazilian musician Antônio Carlos Jobim. The lyrics were written in Portuguese by Vinícius de Moraes and in English by Norman Gimbel. Jobim recorded the song in 1994 with Sting on lead vocals for his album, Antônio Brasileiro.

Background
In Brazil the song goes by the title "Insensatez", which translates more accurately to "Foolishness". The song resembles Chopin's prelude in E minor.

Recorded versions
The song has been performed and recorded often by a diverse group of singers, such as: 
Frank Sinatra
Peggy Lee (1964)
Andy Williams on His Album The Shadow of Your Smile in 1966
Shirley Bassey
Telly Savalas
Olivia Newton-John
Petula Clark 
The Monkees (Recorded in 1968, Released in 1996)
Liberace 
William Shatner
Iggy Pop
Judy Garland
The 5th Dimension
Sinéad O'Connor
Robert Wyatt
Musicians who covered the composition in the jazz genre:
Joao Gilberto
Laurindo Almeida
Wes Montgomery
Stan Getz
Stacey Kent
George Shearing
Diana Krall
Laura Fygi
Pat Martino
Pat Metheny.
Kat Gang
Fabrizio Sotti
Grant Green

See also
List of bossa nova standards

References

1960s jazz standards
Songs with lyrics by Norman Gimbel
Songs with lyrics by Vinicius de Moraes
Songs with music by Antônio Carlos Jobim
Frank Sinatra songs
Andy Williams songs
Bossa nova songs
Brazilian songs
Portuguese-language songs
Vikki Carr songs